The 1983 Can Am season was the sixteenth running of the Sports Car Club of America's prototype series and the seventh of the revived series. 1983 marked the second year of Chevrolet having major competition, with Cosworth taking second at Mosport, first at Lime Rock, second at Trois-Rivières, first at the second race at Mosport, and second at Sears Point. Hart would take third at Lime Rock and third at Trois-Rivières. Porsche would get its first podiums this season, with a win at Road America and third at the second race at Mosport. The dominant chassis were Frissbee, Ensign, Lola, VDS, Scandia, and Ralt. Jacques Villeneuve, Sr. was declared champion, with podiums in almost every race. He would, however, become the final major racecar driver to win a Can Am championship.

Bertil Roos won his second straight two liter class championship.

Results

References

Can-Am seasons
1983 in American motorsport
1983 in Canadian motorsport